Robert Brent Russell (born 5 March 1980) is a South African retired professional rugby union player. He is a "utility back" (capable of playing fullback, fly-half or wing) who plays for Clermont in the French Top 14. He also featured frequently in the Springbok squad before his departure for Europe. He won 23 caps and scored 40 points (8 tries) for his country. Russell  is known by the nickname Pocket Rocket.

His sister, Shelley, were also South Africa field hockey internationals.

National team
Russell was born in Port Elizabeth, but was schooled at Selborne College in East London.  He was quickly brought up to international rugby level when he was selected for the 2002 Springboks team after making a good impression whilst in the national sevens team. In that year, he scored an especially memorable try in the Tri Nations against the Australian Wallabies in which he wriggled out of a seemingly sure tackle and successfully eluded several Wallabies on his way to the tryline. However, he has not been able to consistently break into the Boks lineup in recent years. He is a relatively small player, but what he lacks in size and strength he makes up in speed, acceleration, agility and creativity. He is considered to be one of the most dangerous backline players in South Africa for this very reason, as he has the ability to score a try "out of nothing".

Club rugby
Russell is a victim of his own versatility, with coaches unsure in which position to place him. Although a favourite with the fans and a player of outstanding talent, he made few starts for the Sharks during the 2005/06 season, forcing him to make a move to Western Province where it was said he would be given plenty of game time and would also see him play at fly-half for the Stormers in the Super 14 rather than the utility role he fulfilled at the Sharks.

Russell signed for Saracens F.C. in time for their campaign in 2007. 
In 2008 Russell signed for ASM Clermont Auvergne in the French Top 14.

References

External links 

ESPN Brent Russell
 Saracens Rugby Website

1980 births
Living people
South African people of British descent
ASM Clermont Auvergne players
Rugby union players from Port Elizabeth
Rugby union fly-halves
Rugby union fullbacks
Rugby union wings
Saracens F.C. players
South African rugby union players
South Africa international rugby union players
Stormers players
Western Province (rugby union) players
Pumas (Currie Cup) players
Sharks (Currie Cup) players
Sharks (rugby union) players
South Africa international rugby sevens players
Male rugby sevens players
University of Cape Town alumni
Alumni of Selborne College
White South African people